Paul Albert Fowler (born 12 June 1954) is a former English cricketer.  Fowler was a left-handed batsman.  He was born in Wigan, Lancashire.

Fowler made his debut for Oxfordshire in the 1978 Minor Counties Championship against Wiltshire.  Fowler played Minor counties cricket for Oxfordshire from 1978 to 1987, which included 47 Minor Counties Championship matches and 4 MCCA Knockout Trophy matches.  He made his List A debut against Glamorgan in the 1981 NatWest Trophy.  He played 3 further List A matches, the last coming against Leicesteshire in the 1987 NatWest Trophy.  In his 4 List A matches, he scored 137 runs at a batting average of 34.25, with a single century high score of 119.  This came against Warwickshire in the 1983 NatWest Trophy.

References

External links
Paul Fowler at ESPNcricinfo
Paul Fowler at CricketArchive

1954 births
Living people
Cricketers from Wigan
English cricketers
Oxfordshire cricketers